Mihailo Dobrašinović (Serbian Cyrillic: Михаило Добрашиновић; born 19 June 1986) is a Serbian footballer.

He previously played with FK Čukarički between 2004 and winter break of the 2009-10 season. He went on loan to FK Smederevo for the 2008–09 Serbian First League season helping them achieve promotion to the SuperLiga. He had also played with lower leagues FK Srem Jakovo and FK Kolubara before signing with FK Hajduk Kula.

References

External links
 Mihailo Dobrašinović Stats at Utakmica.rs

1986 births
Living people
People from Zemun
Footballers from Belgrade
Serbian footballers
Association football midfielders
FK Čukarički players
FK Smederevo players
FK Kolubara players
FK Hajduk Kula players
FK Bežanija players
OFK Mladenovac players
FK Zemun players
FK BSK Borča players
FK Mačva Šabac players
FK Sinđelić Beograd players
Serbian SuperLiga players